Sean Brian Gilder (born 1 March 1964) is an English stage, film and screen actor, he is also a playwright

Gilder was born in Brampton, Cumberland, England. He is best known for his portrayal of Paddy Maguire on Shameless from 2005 to 2010, and as Styles on Hornblower. He has appeared in Doctor Who (as the Sycorax Leader) as well as New Tricks, Gangs of New York, and the 2004 film, King Arthur. In Mike Bassett: England Manager he was one of the journalists. According to The Sun newspaper, Gilder left Shameless after series 7 with the reason rumoured to be his bad relationship with actress Tina Malone, who played his character's on screen wife, Mimi.

Other media appearances
In March 2008, Sean appeared as Paddy's gay twin brother Noel in Shameless, however in a trick to viewers, Noel was credited as being played by Neil Grades, an anagram of Sean Gilder. On 3 April 2008, he appeared on The Paul O'Grady Show alongside fellow Shameless star Alice Barry, who played Lillian Tyler.

In January 2014, he was Bosola in The Duchess of Malfi, playing opposite Gemma Arterton in the inaugural production at the Sam Wanamaker Theatre.

In June 2017, he appeared in the third series of the BBC drama Poldark, as Tholly Tregirls.

Personal life
Gilder attended Queen Mary, University of London, where he earned a BA (Hons) in Modern History and Third World Studies. He then trained at the Webber Douglas Academy of Dramatic Art and entered the profession in 1987.

He is married to actress Robin Weaver and they have two children named Thomas and Violet.

Filmography

Video games

References

External links

seangilder.com

1964 births
Alumni of Queen Mary University of London
Alumni of the Webber Douglas Academy of Dramatic Art
English male soap opera actors
Living people